Canadian International School Vietnam (CIS) is a private international school based in Ho Chi Minh City, Vietnam. The school belongs to The Canadian International School System (CISS), along with three other campuses: the Bilingual Canadian International School (BCIS), Albert Einstein School (AES) and Canada – Vietnam Kindergarten (CVK). 

Founded in 2009, CIS was consulted by the District School Board of Niagara (DSBN), becoming the first international school in Vietnam to offer a Canadian curriculum. In 2010, a $21 million campus was launched in Bình Chánh district, serving 30 classes from kindergarten to grade 10. Established in 2014, the current campus in Phu My Hung (District 7) has a total area of 39,000 m2 with a total investment of $46 million. That same year, CIS began its partnership with Toronto District School Board, Canada's largest school board.

CIS is among international schools recognized by the Ministry of Education and Training (Vietnam) with a 100% English curriculum according to the Ontario Ministry of Education (Canada) standards from kindergarten to grade 12. Since 2015, CIS is an accredited International Baccalaureate school. Its students have received scholarships from Boston University, University of Illinois Chicago, University of Alberta, and Ottawa University.

CIS heavily promotes sports activities for its students; the school has established 41 sports teams as of 2021, with the participation of students from 7 to 18 years old. Its stadium, named Maple Leaf Center, has been chosen as the home field of Vietnamese professional basketball team Saigon Heat since the 2014 season.

References

External links
 
 

International schools in Ho Chi Minh City
Canadian international schools in Vietnam